Tamworth Distilling is a small-batch distillery located in Tamworth, New Hampshire. The distillery is known for producing small batch spirits with local ingredients.

History 
Tamworth Distilling was founded in 2015 by Steven Grasse, a student of transcendentalism who grew up summering in New Hampshire. Grasse, who had previously developed brands like Hendrick's Gin and Sailor Jerry Rum, came up with the concept for the distillery after discussing with whiskey enthusiast Jamie Oakes and Matt Powers. Tamworth Distilling was intended to revitalize the town of Tamworth, which Grasse described as the most idyllic place possible, by employing local farmers and attracting young people.

The distillery was built on the grounds of the former Tamworth Inn, with Tamworth Garden (formerly a venue for theater, music, and boxing matches) serving as the barrelhouse. The distillery's products include vodka, rye whiskey, eau de vie, gin, applejack, liqueurs and infused vodkas. It operates under a wilderness-to-bottle model and is known for using foraged ingredients in its spirits.

Since its founding, the distillery has produced themed spirits such as Eau de Musc, a whiskey flavoured with castoreum. In 2015, the distillery produced Skiklubben Aquavit as part of a fundraiser to restore the Nansen Ski Jump. An updated recipe of the aquavit was made available in 2018. In October 2019, the distillery released Graverobber Unholy Whiskey, which was produced using maple syrup from cemetery maple trees.

Beginning in 2017, a selection of products from Tamworth Distilling became available in Philadelphia via the retail shop and bar Art in the Age.

In March 2020 during the COVID-19 pandemic, the distillery began producing hand sanitizer which was donated to the Tamworth Community Nurse Association.

References

External links 
Official website

Microdistilleries
2015 establishments in New Hampshire
American companies established in 2015
Food and drink companies established in 2015
Distilleries in New Hampshire